Bellwood is a village in Butler County, Nebraska, United States. The population was 435 at the 2010 census.

History
Bellwood was laid out in 1890 when the railroad was extended to that point.
 It was named for its founder, Jesse D. Bell.

Geography
Bellwood is located at  (41.342174, -97.239220).

Demographics

2010 census
At the 2010 census there were 435 people, 167 households, and 117 families living in the village. The racial makeup of the village was 99.1% White, 0.2% Asian, and 0.7% from two or more races. Hispanic or Latino of any race were 0.7%.

Of the 167 households 35.3% had children under the age of 18 living with them, 58.1% were married couples living together, 6.0% had a female householder with no husband present, 6.0% had a male householder with no wife present, and 29.9% were non-families. 26.3% of households were one person and 13.8% were one person aged 65 or older. The average household size was 2.60 and the average family size was 3.18.

The median age in the village was 37.6 years. 31.7% of residents were under the age of 18; 2.9% were between the ages of 18 and 24; 25.7% were from 25 to 44; 24.4% were from 45 to 64; and 15.4% were 65 or older. The gender makeup of the village was 49.2% male and 50.8% female.

2000 census
At the 2000 census there were 446 people, 185 households, and 120 families living in the village. The population density was 1,871.7 people per square mile (717.5/km). There were 196 housing units at an average density of 822.6 per square mile (315.3/km).  The racial makeup of the village was 100.00% White. Hispanic or Latino of any race were 0.45%.

Of the 185 households 29.2% had children under the age of 18 living with them, 57.8% were married couples living together, 7.0% had a female householder with no husband present, and 35.1% were non-families. 31.9% of households were one person and 15.1% were one person aged 65 or older. The average household size was 2.41 and the average family size was 3.11.

The age distribution was 26.2% under the age of 18, 9.2% from 18 to 24, 25.6% from 25 to 44, 22.9% from 45 to 64, and 16.1% 65 or older. The median age was 36 years. For every 100 females, there were 103.7 males. For every 100 females age 18 and over, there were 101.8 males.

The median household income was $33,750, and the median family income  was $39,286. Males had a median income of $28,281 versus $21,125 for females. The per capita income for the village was $14,342. About 1.6% of families and 5.4% of the population were below the poverty line, including 7.3% of those under age 18 and 9.6% of those age 65 or over.

Points of interest
 Gustav Rohrich Sod House

References

Villages in Butler County, Nebraska
Villages in Nebraska